was a Japanese serial killer who lured his victims via the internet and killed three people in 2005. Also known as the "Suicide Website Murderer", Maeue suffered from a paraphilic psychosexual disorder that translated into being unable to achieve sexual release in the absence of performing an act of strangulation.

Earlier crimes
Maeue attended the Kanazawa Institute of Technology, where in 1988 he attempted to strangle a male friend, resulting in him dropping out. In 1995, he was arrested and charged with assault after beating and attempting to asphyxiate a male work associate. After settling out of court, he was released and fired from his job. In 2001, he was arrested once more for the attempted strangling of two women and sentenced to a year in prison and 3 years of suspended sentence. After being released early on good behavior, he was arrested yet again in 2002 for attempting to strangle a junior high school boy, for which he was sentenced to 22 months in prison.

Suicide website murders
In 2005, soon after his release from prison, he murdered three people. He was convicted of killing a 14-year-old boy, a 25-year-old woman, and a 21-year-old man, all of whom were members of an online suicide club. He lured his victims by suggesting they meet and end their lives together by committing suicide via carbon monoxide poisoning using a charcoal burner in a sealed car. However, after a brief conversation, he would instead strangle them. He later said that the murders gave him sexual pleasure, and claimed he developed a desire to kill this way after reading about similar events in a mystery novel as a child.

Trial and death
In his trial, prosecutors called Maeue a "lust murderer". On March 28, 2007, the Osaka District Court sentenced him to death. Although his defence team launched an appeal, he accepted the judgment of the court and expressed a willingness to pay for his crimes with his life, retracting his appeal on July 5, 2007. 

On July 28, 2009, Maeue was hanged in Osaka, along with 25-year-old serial killer Yukio Yamaji.

See also
Erotic asphyxiation
Internet homicide
List of executions in Japan
List of serial killers by country

References

External links
Alleged killer linked to suicide site.  The Japan Times, August 7, 2005.
3 die in fake net suicide pacts.  The Sydney Morning Herald, August 8, 2005.
Japanese net suicide pact murderer to hang.  The Register, March 28, 2007.
Death sentence.  Shanghai Daily, March 29, 2007.
 Suicide Website Murders 

1968 births
2005 murders in Japan
2009 deaths
21st-century executions by Japan
Executed Japanese serial killers
Computer criminals
Japanese criminals
Japanese murderers of children
Japanese people convicted of murder
Male serial killers
People convicted of murder by Japan
People executed by Japan by hanging